Abdul Wadud Khan is a Jatiya Party (Ershad) politician and the former Member of Parliament of Rajshahi-5.

Career
Khan was elected to parliament from Rajshahi-5 as a Jatiya Party candidate in 1988. He lost the 1991 election to Bangladesh Nationalist Party candidate, M. A. Matin.

References

Jatiya Party politicians
Living people
4th Jatiya Sangsad members
Year of birth missing (living people)